Celalettin is a Turkish masculine given name.

List of people with the name 

 Celalettin Arif, (1875–1928) was a Turkish politician
 Celalettin Güvenç (born 1959), Turkish politician
 Celalettin Muhtar Ozden (1865–1947), Turkish dermatologist
 Mustafa Celalettin Pasha (1826–1876), Ottoman-Polish strategist, writer, and military official

See also 

 Cemalettinköy, Ahlat

Given names
Masculine given names
Turkish masculine given names